Lajos Szűcs may refer to:

Lajos Szűcs (footballer, born 1943), Hungarian footballer and double Olympic medalist
Lajos Szűcs (footballer, born 1973), Hungarian footballer and 1996 Olympic participant
 Lajos Szűcs (politician) (born 1964), Hungarian politician and Member of Parliament
Lajos Szűcs (weightlifter) (1946–1999), Hungarian weightlifter and Olympic silver medalist in 1972